No Never Alone is the debut album by Canadian singer-songwriter Justin Rutledge, released in 2004 on Six Shooter Records.

A remastered "deluxe edition" was released in 2012 on Outside Music. The process of revisiting the album's material in turn inspired his 2013 album Valleyheart, which he described in interviews as a response from his older, more mature and more experienced self to No Never Alone's "young kid who just wrote what he felt".

Track listing

References

2005 albums
Justin Rutledge albums
Six Shooter Records albums